Ken Leemans (born 5 January 1983, in Vilvoorde) is a former Belgian footballer.

Career
Leemans is a midfielder who was born in Vilvoorde and made his debut in professional football, being part of the KV Mechelen squad in the 2000–01 season. He also played for Roda JC before joining VVV Venlo for the second time in his career.

On 24 April 2009, Leemans scored the decisive 1–0 goal in the match against HFC Haarlem in the Jupiler League, which resulted in promotion to VVV-Venlo. That means that VVV will be playing in the Eredivisie in the 2009/10 season.

References

External links
 
 

1983 births
Living people
Belgian footballers
K.V. Mechelen players
Roda JC Kerkrade players
VVV-Venlo players
FC Hansa Rostock players
Eredivisie players
Belgian expatriate footballers
Eerste Divisie players
Belgian Pro League players
Expatriate footballers in the Netherlands
Belgian expatriate sportspeople in the Netherlands
Expatriate footballers in Germany
Belgian expatriate sportspeople in Germany
People from Vilvoorde
De Treffers players
3. Liga players
Association football midfielders
Footballers from Flemish Brabant